Maksim Sergeyevich Vasilyev (born 10 February 1999) is a Russian football player.

Club career
He made his debut in the Russian Professional Football League for FC Krylia Sovetov-2 Samara on 3 August 2017 in a game against FC Anzhi-Yunior Zelenodolsk.

He made his Russian Football National League debut for FC Sibir Novosibirsk on 1 September 2018 in a game against FC Tambov.

References

External links
 Profile by Russian Professional Football League

1999 births
Sportspeople from Novosibirsk
Living people
Russian footballers
Association football defenders
PFC Krylia Sovetov Samara players
FC Sibir Novosibirsk players
FC Chayka Peschanokopskoye players
FC Chita players
Russian First League players
Russian Second League players